Tamridjet (Arabic: تامريجت) is a town in northern Algeria. It is in the Souk El Tenine District of Béjaïa Province.

Communes of Béjaïa Province
Cities in Algeria
Algeria